The Nizhny Novgorod Kremlin is a fortress in Nizhny Novgorod, the historic city center.

History 

The first attempt to replace the wooden fort with a stone kremlin was recorded in 1374, but construction was limited to a single tower, known as the Dmitrovskaya Tower (this has not survived). Under the rule of Ivan III, Nizhny Novgorod played the role of a guard city, having a permanent garrison; it served as a place for gathering troops for Moscow’s actions against the Khanate of Kazan. In order to strengthen the defenses of the city, construction works on the walls began again.

Construction of the stone Kremlin of Nizhny Novgorod began in 1500 with the building of the Ivanovskaya Tower; the main work commenced in 1508 and by 1515 a grandiose building was completed. The oak walls that formed the old fortifications were destroyed by a huge fire in 1513. The two kilometer wall was reinforced by 13 towers (one of them – Zachatskaya – was on the shore of the Volga; not preserved, but was rebuilt in 2012). This “Stone City” had a permanent garrison with solid artillery weapons. With the fall of Kazan, Nizhny Novgorod Kremlin lost its military significance, and later it housed the city and provincial authorities.

During the World War II, the roofs of the Taynitskaya, the Severnaya, and the Chasovaya Towers were dismantled and anti-aircraft machine guns were installed on the upper platforms. Thus, the fortress defended the airspace of the city from the Luftwaffe. The Luftwaffe bombed the Kanavinsky Bridge and the Fair, but the Kremlin's air defense defended these objects.

The Council of Ministers of the RSFSR issued an order on January 30, 1949 for the restoration of the Nizhny Novgorod Kremlin.

In October 2018, archaeologists discovered the remains of a medieval settlement and cemetery on the site of the destroyed church of St. Simeon Stylites. The finds belong to the 13th century, and the most ancient cultural layer - to 1221, when Nizhny Novgorod was founded. After all the excavations, the exhibits will be museified, and the church of St. Simeon the Stylite will be recreated at this place.

In 2021, before the 800th anniversary of Nizhny Novgorod, a major restoration was carried out. Under its terms, the most important thing was the restoration of the historic "battle road" inside the Kremlin wall. The city had been waiting for this event for 230 years. Since August 2021, locals and tourists can walk a full circular route along the large fortress wall while inside it. Its length is 2 km.

Towers 
The following 13 towers survive. Counter clockwise:

 Georgievskaya Tower
 Borisoglebskaya Tower (destroyed by a landslide in the 18th century, rebuilt in 1972)
 Zachatskaya Tower (destroyed by a landslide in the 18th century, rebuilt in 2012)
 Belaya Tower
 Ivanovskaya Tower
 Chasovaya Tower
 Severnaya Tower
 Taynitskaya Tower
 Koromyslova Tower 
 Nikolskaya Tower
 Kladovaya Tower
 Dmitrievskaya Tower
 Porokhovaya Tower

Other buildings and constructions 

The Kremlin contained many churches, but the only survivor is the Michael the Archangel Cathedral (the 'Archangel Cathedral'), built no later than the middle of the 16th century and rebuilt in 1628-1631. It is the oldest surviving building in the Kremlin. The cathedral contains the tomb of Kuzma Minin.
In 1828, an obelisk in honor of Kuzma Minin and Dmitry Pozharsky was constructed in front of the Archangel Cathedral (architect Melnikov and Martos).

The house of the military governor was built in 1837-1841; it is now the Museum of Art.
The Arsenal was built in 1840-1843 at the direction of Nicholas I.
In 1931, the Transfiguration Cathedral was replaced by the House of Soviets; that building is now the City Council building.

In 1965, a memorial complex in honor of Nizhny Novgorod citizens who died in World War II was created, near the obelisk of Minin and Pozharsky; this included an eternal flame.

Since 1980, the military-patriotic memorial “Gorky for the front!” Has been located on the territory of the Kremlin. It presents the military equipment that Gorky supplied the Soviet army to the Eastern Front of World War II to fight the Nazi troops. At the entrance to the memorial there is a memorial sign faced with granite slabs. On one of the plates, the text is engraved: “From generation to generation, words will be passed on about those who defended the Soviet Motherland with weapons in their hands in a time of terrible trials, and about those who forged weapons, who built tanks and planes, who cooked steel for shells who, with their labor exploits, were worthy of the military valor of soldiers. Pravda, June 8, 1942.” On another granite slab, the words are engraved: “2,360 tanks, 1,500 aircraft, 9,000 self-propelled guns, 10,000 mortars have been delivered to the front. The city's enterprises produced Katyusha combat vehicles and other military equipment.”

Also, on the territory of the memorial on July 2, 2020, a monument was erected to “Gorky residents - valiant workers of the rear” and the city was awarded the title “City of Labour Valour”.

References

External links 
Nizhny Novgorod Kremlin
Archangel's Cathedral, Cathedral of St. Michael the Archangel (Nizhny Novgorod)

Kremlin
Kremlins
Buildings and structures in Nizhny Novgorod
Castles in Russia
Cultural heritage monuments of federal significance in Nizhny Novgorod Oblast